Narhari Sitaram Zirwal is an Indian politician who is serving as the Deputy Speaker of Maharashtra Legislative Assembly and is a member of the Nationalist Congress Party. He is a three term member of the Maharashtra Legislative Assembly from Dindori in Maharashtra.

Positions held 
Member of the Maharashtra Legislative Assembly (MLA) for 3 Terms: 1999-2004, 2009-2014, 2019–present.

References

Living people
Maharashtra MLAs 2014–2019
1959 births
Nationalist Congress Party politicians